Vladimir Futáš (born 20 August 1979) is a figure skater who represented Slovakia in men's singles and pairs. As a pair skater, he competed in the final segment at a total of six ISU Championships. He skated with Diana Rišková, Maria Guerassimenko, Milica Brozović, and Oľga Beständigová.

Career

Single skating 
Futáš began learning to skate in 1985. As a single skater, he competed internationally for Slovakia in the junior and senior ranks. He achieved his highest international senior-level placement, 7th, at the 1997 Ondrej Nepela Memorial. The 1999 Winter Universiade was his final competition as a single skater.

Partnership with Rišková 
By the 1996–1997 season, Futáš was also appearing as a pair skater with Diana Rišková. Representing Slovakia, the two placed 13th at the 1999 World Junior Championships in Zagreb, Croatia, and 12th at the 2000 World Junior Championships in Oberstdorf, Germany.

In the 2000–2001  season, Rišková/Futáš won silver medals at the ISU Junior Grand Prix in the Czech Republic, the Ondrej Nepela Memorial, and the Slovak Championships. The pair finished 15th at the 2001 World Junior Championships in Sofia, Bulgaria.  They were coached by Vladimir Dvojnikov. They dissolved their partnership at the end of the season.

Partnership with Guerassimenko 
In 2001, Futáš teamed up with Maria Guerassimenko. In their first season together, they took silver at the Slovak Championships and placed 14th at the 2002 European Championships in Lausanne, Switzerland.

In their second season, Guerassimenko/Futáš took gold at the 2002 Ondrej Nepela Memorial and silver at the 2002 Golden Spin of Zagreb. They placed 11th at the 2003 European Championships in Malmö, Sweden, and 18th at the 2003 World Championships in Washington, D.C., United States. Vladimir Dvojnikov coached the pair in Bratislava.

Partnership with Brozović 
In the spring of 2003, Futáš teamed up with Milica Brozović. During their first season together, they appeared at one Grand Prix event, placing 8th at the 2003 NHK Trophy, and became the Slovak national champions. They placed 14th at the 2004 European Championships in Budapest, Hungary; and 15th at the 2004 World Championships in Dortmund, Germany.

In their second and final season together, Brozović/Futáš took silver at the 2004 Ondrej Nepela Memorial and finished 9th at a Grand Prix competition, the 2004 Skate Canada International. They were coached by Vladimir Dvojnikov in Bratislava.

Partnership with Beständigová 
In the 2005–2006 season, Futáš had a brief partnership with Oľga Beständigová. At the 2005 Karl Schäfer Memorial, the pair sought an Olympic spot for Slovakia but their placement, 11th, was not enough to qualify an entry to the 2006 Winter Olympics.

Programs

With Brozović

With Guerassimenko

With Rišková

Competitive highlights
GP: Grand Prix; JGP: Junior Grand Prix (Junior Series)

With Beständigová

With Brozović

With Guerassimenko

With Rišková

Men's singles

References

External links 

 
 
 

Slovak male pair skaters
Slovak male single skaters
Living people
1979 births
Sportspeople from Košice
Ukrainian emigrants to Slovakia
Competitors at the 1999 Winter Universiade